"Livin' the Dream" is a song recorded by American country music singer Morgan Wallen. It was released on November 20, 2020 from his second studio album Dangerous: The Double Album. The song was co-wrote by Wallen, Hardy, Ben Burgess and Jacob Durrett, and produced by Joey Moi.

Content
"Livin' the Dream" is a song about Wallen's "wild lifestyle" as a musician. Its lyrics tell his story of the difficulties that one faces as a famous musician. Wallen said "Livin' the Dream" is "one of, if not the most personal songs on my new record".

Critical reception
Reporter Rachel Rutherford said: "It gave everyone a whole new perspective for having fame and a new respect for famous people."

Charts

Weekly charts

Year-end charts

Certifications

References

2020 songs
Morgan Wallen songs
Songs written by Morgan Wallen
Songs written by Hardy (singer)
Song recordings produced by Joey Moi